Daniel Alejandro Vega (born 19 October 1981) is a former Argentine footballer who played as a forward.

Career

Vega played several years and for various teams in the lower league Primera B Metropolitana and in 2007 he played for Platense in the Primera B Nacional, both in Argentina. In Platense, he was the top goal scorer with 13 goals. 

Subsequently, Vega joined Ecuadorian club Emelec. He scored his first goal with Emelec on his debut on the Ecuadorian League against Macará. In that game he also made the assist in fellow striker Gonzalo Ludueña's goal.

Personal life

Vega is known to be a family-oriented man. When he was signed by Ecuadorian side Emelec he arrived to Guayaquil with both his parents, his sister and his soon to be wife, Lorena. In December 2007 Vega received a degree as a Public Accountant and according to him, getting that degree was the main reason why he did not leave Argentina earlier despite of all the offers from abroad he has had in his career.

Playing style

Because he is not a tall or strong center forward, Vega plays better near the opposite goal and when it comes to finishing a play he has demonstrated to be as accurate with his left foot as he is with his natural right foot. He is also a very good header.

References

External links
Daniel A. Vega official website
 Argentine Primera statistics

1981 births
Living people
Footballers from Buenos Aires
Argentine footballers
Club Atlético Platense footballers
Estudiantes de Buenos Aires footballers
Club Atlético Los Andes footballers
C.S. Emelec footballers
San Martín de Tucumán footballers
Godoy Cruz Antonio Tomba footballers
Club Almirante Brown footballers
Club Atlético Huracán footballers
Talleres de Remedios de Escalada footballers
UAI Urquiza players
Expatriate footballers in Ecuador
Argentine Primera División players
Primera Nacional players
Primera B Metropolitana players
Ecuadorian Serie A players
Association football forwards